Szanto Spur is a noteworthy rock spur jutting from the north wall into Priestley Glacier, Victoria Land, at the head of the glacier. Mapped by United States Geological Survey (USGS) from surveys and U.S. Navy air photos, 1960–64. Named by Advisory Committee on Antarctic Names (US-ACAN) for Otto R. Szanto, U.S. Navy, radio man who served in Antarctic support activities for 4 seasons at McMurdo Station in the 1960s.

Mountains of Victoria Land
Pennell Coast